The NSU Sharks Women's Soccer team represents Nova Southeastern University in Davie, Florida. They currently compete in the Sunshine State Conference.

History
Among the highlights of the 2004 campaign was the first-ever victory for an NSU team in a Sunshine State Conference Tournament game, as the Knights knocked off nationally ranked Lynn University 2–1 on the road in the SSC quarterfinals. NSU lost to eventual SSC Tournament Champion Tampa in the semifinals, but proved it can compete with the best in the conference.

The 2002 season saw the Knights break a number of program records en route to a 13–5 record in the program’s first year playing in NCAA Division II. The Knights set school records for fewest losses, consecutive home wins (6), home wins in a season (8) and fewest goals allowed in a season (22). The Knights also received National Poll votes in the NCAA.

Season by season record

Soccer, Women
NCAA Division II women's soccer teams
Soccer clubs in Miami